The 2020 Oklahoma Democratic presidential primary took place on March 3, 2020, as one of 15 contests scheduled on Super Tuesday in the Democratic Party primaries for the 2020 presidential election, following the South Carolina primary the weekend before. The Oklahoma primary was a semi-closed primary, with the state awarding 43 delegates towards the 2020 Democratic National Convention, of which 37 were pledged delegates allocated on the basis of the results of the primary.

Former vice president Joe Biden won another southern primary by a large margin with almost 39% of the vote and 21 delegates, while senator Bernie Sanders placed second with around 25% and 13 delegates. Former mayor Michael Bloomberg and senator Elizabeth Warren did not reach the threshold, only getting a few district delegates. The election was a remarkable shift from 2016 when Sanders had won nearly every county and easily defeated Hillary Clinton by a double digit margin.

Procedure
Oklahoma was one of 14 states and one territory holding primaries on March 3, 2020, also known as "Super Tuesday". Voting took place throughout the state from 7:00 a.m. until 7:00 p.m. In the semi-closed primary, candidates had to meet a threshold of 15 percent at the congressional district or statewide level in order to be considered viable. The 42 pledged delegates to the 2020 Democratic National Convention were allocated proportionally on the basis of the results of the primary. Of these, between 4 and 6 were allocated to each of the state's 5 congressional districts and another 5 were allocated to party leaders and elected officials (PLEO delegates), in addition to 8 at-large delegates. The Super Tuesday primary as part of Stage I on the primary timetable received no bonus delegates, in order to disperse the primaries between more different date clusters and keep too many states from hoarding on the first shared date or on a March date in general.

The state convention was subsequently held on April 4, 2020, in Tulsa to vote on the national convention delegates. The state delegation also included 6 unpledged PLEO delegates: 5 members of the Democratic National Committee and a single representative from Congress, Kendra Horn.

Candidates
The following 14 candidates have filed and are on the ballot in Oklahoma:

Running

 Joe Biden
 Michael Bloomberg
 Tulsi Gabbard
 Bernie Sanders
 Elizabeth Warren

Withdrawn

 Michael Bennet
 Pete Buttigieg
 Cory Booker
 Julián Castro
 Amy Klobuchar
 Deval Patrick
 Tom Steyer
 Marianne Williamson
 Andrew Yang

Polling

Results

Results by county

See also
 2020 Oklahoma Republican presidential primary

Notes

References

External links
The Green Papers delegate allocation summary
Oklahoma Democratic Party delegate selection plan

Oklahoma Democratic
Democratic primary
2020